Denis Cullen (19 August 1886 – 26 November 1971) was an Irish Labour Party politician and trade union official.

A baker by trade, during the 1910s he emerged as a leading figure in the Dublin branch of the Irish Bakers' National Amalgamated Union. At the 1918 national convention – at which the union's name was changed to the Irish Bakers, Confectioners, and Allied Workers Amalgamated Union – Cullen was elected national general secretary, commencing a twenty-five-year tenure (1918–1943), during which he was chief negotiator for both the national union and Dublin branch. He was also prominent in the leadership of the Irish Trades Union Congress (ITUC), serving almost continually on the national executive (1920–1939, 1940–1943), as treasurer (1929–1930), and for two terms as president (1925–1926, 1930–1931).

In 1925 the Labour Party identified high taxation as a government weakness and decided to contest the Dublin North and Dublin South by-elections. Cullen, as general secretary of the Irish Bakers, Confectioners and Allied Workers Amalgamated Union, was candidate in Dublin North with Thomas Lawlor, Irish Municipal Employees Union, in Dublin South. Neither of them were elected.

He was elected to Dáil Éireann as a Labour Party Teachta Dála (TD) for the Dublin North constituency at the June 1927 general election. He lost his seat at the September 1927 general election having only served 3 months as a TD.

References

1886 births
1971 deaths
Irish trade union leaders
Labour Party (Ireland) TDs
Members of the 5th Dáil
Politicians from County Dublin